The Melbourne Shakespeare Society was founded in Melbourne, Australia, in 1884 at the suggestion of Edward Ellis Morris who was president from 1884 to 1888. Other original members included: William Ievers, James Smith, James Edward Neild (president in 1890).

Past presidents of the society include:
Edward Ellis Morris 1884–1888
James Edward Neild 1890
John Purves Wilson 1901-1903
Alfred Hart
Arthur Way
Edward Sugden 1908
Morris Mondle Phillips
Philip David Phillips
Archibald Thomas Strong 1913
Edward Sugden 1914–1915
Ernest Henry Clark Oliphant 1919–1921
William Alexander Osborne
Edward Stevens

References

Arts organizations established in 1884
Organisations based in Victoria (Australia)
1884 establishments in Australia
William Shakespeare